The Mortal Instruments: City of Bones is a 2013 urban fantasy film based on the first book of The Mortal Instruments series by Cassandra Clare. It was directed by Harald Zwart, with a script written by Jessica Postigo. The film stars Lily Collins as Clary Fray, a teenager from New York City who meets a group of Nephilim known as the Shadowhunters while also discovering her own heritage and her family history. The cast also include Jamie Campbell Bower, Robert Sheehan, Kevin Zegers, Lena Headey, Kevin Durand, Aidan Turner, Jemima West, Godfrey Gao, C. C. H. Pounder, Jared Harris, and Jonathan Rhys Meyers.

The film's development began when Constantin Film optioned the film rights to the book series. Casting announcements started in 2010, with Collins being the first actress attached to the project. Principal photography took place in Ontario between August and November 2012. It is an international co-production between Germany and Canada.

The Mortal Instruments: City of Bones premiered in Los Angeles on August 12, and was released in August 21, 2013 by Entertainment One in Canada and by Constantin Film in Germany. It was released in the United States on the same day by Screen Gems. The film grossed $95.3 million worldwide against a production budget of $60 million and received generally negative reviews from critics for it's plot and lack of originality.

The film was originally intended to launch a film series and to continue with a sequel based on the second book, City of Ashes, that was in development with Sigourney Weaver set to join the cast. However, it was postponed indefinitely and ultimately cancelled due to the film's poor performance. A reboot television series, titled Shadowhunters, premiered in 2016 on Freeform and ran for three seasons.

Plot
New York City teenager Clary Fray begins seeing and drawing a strange symbol, worrying her mother Jocelyn Fray and family friend, Luke Garroway. At a crowded nightclub with friend, Simon Lewis, only Clary witnesses Jace Wayland and his accomplices killing a man. The next day, two men, Emil Pangborn and Samuel Blackwell, arrive at the Fray apartment searching for a cup. Jocelyn calls Clary, frantically telling her to stay away and to warn Luke about someone named Valentine; she then drinks a potion putting her in a deep sleep. Returning home, Clary finds her mother missing and is attacked by a dog-like creature. Jace, a "Shadowhunter", appears and kills it, explaining that it, like the "man" killed at the nightclub, was a demon in another form.

With help from the Frays' neighbor, Madame Dorothea, a witch, Jace deduces that Pangborn and Blackwell seek a lost artifact called the Mortal Cup. Jace and Clary, along with Simon, go to Luke's antique store. Pangborn and Blackwell are forcibly interrogating Luke who, to protect Clary and Jocelyn, falsely claims he cares nothing about the Frays and only wants the Mortal Cup. The trio escapes to the Shadowhunter Institute, a hidden cathedral-like building, where Jace treats Clary, who was stung by the demon. She and Simon meet two other Shadowhunters, siblings Alec and Isabelle Lightwood, and Shadowhunter leader, Hodge. Clary learns that Shadowhunters, invisible to mortals, are half-human, half-angel demon slayers. Clary has inherited her Shadowhunter mother's powers, including drawing temporary magical runes on the skin. The Mortal Cup is one of three Mortal Instruments given to the first Shadowhunter by the Angel Raziel. Shadowhunters are either descended from other Shadowhunters or made by drinking from the cup. Hodge explains that Valentine Morgenstern, an ex-Shadowhunter who betrayed the order, now seeks the Cup to control both Shadowhunters and demons.

Jace takes Clary to the City of Bones, a sanctuary beneath a cemetery. When the Silent Brothers attempt to unlock Clary's blocked memories, they uncover a connection to Magnus Bane, the High Warlock of Brooklyn. At Bane's nightclub, he tells Clary that Jocelyn had him block knowledge of the Shadowhunter world from Clary's mind. When Vampires kidnap Simon, Jace, Alec, Isabelle, and Clary trail them to their hideout. They find Simon, but vampires outnumber them. Werewolves intervene and save them.

As Simon recovers at the Institute, Clary notices two puncture marks on his shoulder, while he discovers he suddenly no longer needs eyeglasses. Clary shares a romantic evening with Jace, ending in a kiss. When Simon jealously confronts Clary about it, she downplays the incident, angering Jace. Simon confesses he loves Clary, though she does not reciprocate his feelings.

Clary realizes the Mortal Cup is hidden inside one of Madame Dorothea's tarot cards that her mother painted as a gift. The group goes to Dorothea's apartment, but a demon has replaced her. Simon and Jace kill it, but Alec is lethally stung. Clary retrieves the Mortal Cup card, and they return to the institute. Hodge summons Magnus Bane to heal Alec.

Clary removes the Mortal Cup from the card and gives it to Hodge, who betrays them by summoning Valentine Morgenstern through a portal and giving him the Cup. When Valentine reveals he is Clary's father, she refuses to join him. She puts the cup back into the card, then escapes through the portal that transports her to Luke's store. Luke, revealed to be the werewolf who helped fight the vampires, confirms that Valentine is her father and says Clary had an older brother named Jonathan, who died as a toddler. Luke and his werewolf pack go to the Institute with Clary to battle Valentine after he summons demons through a roof opening. Simon finds Jocelyn, still unconscious, at the Institute, and he and Isabelle close the roof opening with help from a repentant Hodge.

Clary and Jace fight Valentine, who lies by claiming Jace is his son. Clary tricks Valentine by giving him a replica Mortal Cup, then pushes him into the portal, destroying it. Jocelyn is rescued but remains unresponsive at the hospital. Clary uses her new-found powers to repair the apartment. Jace arrives, confessing he needs her and disbelieves they are siblings and will uncover the truth. Realizing she belongs in the Shadowhunter world, Clary returns to the Institute with Jace.

Cast

 Lily Collins as Clary   
 Jamie Campbell Bower as Jace  
 Robert Sheehan as Simon
 Kevin Zegers as Alec
 Lena Headey as Jocelyn
 Kevin Durand as Pangborn 
 Aidan Turner as Luke
 Jemima West as Isabelle
 Godfrey Gao as Magnus Bane
 C. C. H. Pounder as Dorothea
 Jared Harris as Hodge
 Jonathan Rhys Meyers as Valentine

Production

Pre-production

While shopping the film prospect around, author Cassandra Clare had difficulty finding a studio interested in making a film with a female in the lead role. Studios asked her to switch the lead to a male character, which she refused.

On December 9, 2010, it was announced that Lily Collins had been cast in the role of Clary Fray.

Alex Pettyfer was originally offered the role of Jace Wayland, but turned it down. Alexander Ludwig, Ed Speleers and Leebo Freeman tested for the role but it went to Jamie Campbell Bower. Xavier Samuel, Nico Tortorella, Max Irons, and Douglas Booth were also in consideration.

The film is a co-production of the Germany company Constantin Film Produktion GmbH and Canadian company Don Carmody Productions and a co-production with Unique Features.

Scott Stewart had initially been attached to direct the film, but he left to produce a television series based on Legion. Harald Zwart replaced him shortly after.

Filming
Principal photography took place between August 20 and November 7, 2012, on location in Toronto and Hamilton, Ontario, and New York City.

Music
Two soundtracks were released for the film: The Mortal Instruments: City of Bones (Original Motion Picture Soundtrack) was released by Republic Records in stores and digital retailers on August 20, 2013. Upon its first week, the album debuted at #32 on the US Billboard 200. The same day, Atli Örvarsson's score was released into a separate album, for physical purchase and digital download.

The soundtrack is headlined by Demi Lovato, Zedd, Colbie Caillat, AFI remixed by LA Riots, and Jessie J among others. It is a collaboration between trance DJs Myon & Shane 54 with Seven Lions, as well as a song by Bryan Ellis, produced by Brian West. Some songs, including Lovato's "Heart by Heart" and Caillat's "When the Darkness Comes", were recorded specifically for City of Bones. Zedd "scored for a key scene in the film". Caillat's "When the Darkness Comes" were released as the first promotional single on July 9, 2013. "Almost Is Never Enough", performed by Ariana Grande and Nathan Sykes was released as the second single from the album on August 19, 2013 and debuted on the Billboard Hot 100 at number 84.

Beth Crowley had also written a song inspired by the movie called "Warrior". "All I Need" by Radiohead was the song used in the trailer for the film.

Release
A teaser trailer was released in November 2012, and a second trailer was released March 2013. The film was originally due for release on August 23, 2013, but was pushed back two days earlier, on August 21, 2013. The film secured broad European distribution deals at Cannes.

The film premiered on August 12, 2013, at the Cinerama Dome in Hollywood.

Marketing
 
According to the Los Angeles Times, $60 million was spent on marketing. Kulzer, Constantin's co-president, stated "$60 million has been spent worldwide on prints and advertising...." and went on to explain the importance of managing expectations.

Home media
The Mortal Instruments: City of Bones was released on DVD and Blu-ray on December 3, 2013, by Sony Pictures Home Entertainment.

Reception

Critical response

Review aggregation website Rotten Tomatoes gives the film an approval rating of 13% based on 128 reviews and a rating average of 3.9/10. The site commented that "The Mortal Instruments: City of Bones borrows ingredients from seemingly every fantasy franchise of the last 30 years—but can't seem to figure out what to do with them." At Metacritic, which assigns a normalized rating out of 100, the film has a score of 33% based on reviews from 35 critics, indicating "generally unfavorable reviews."

The Telegraph's Robbie Collin gave the film one out of five stars, saying, "This gothic teen fantasy is one of the most disastrous page-to-screen adaptations in memory". Collin added "the plot is an incomprehensible tangle of dead ends and recaps, and afterwards you realise only two things have stuck: the story's countless unsubtle borrowings from very recent pop culture... and a brief aside in which we learn one of the earliest demon-hunters was Johann Sebastian Bach." Michael Rechtshaffen from The Hollywood Reporter also gave it a negative review, saying, "Certainly not the first and very unlikely the last studio attempt at launching a Twilight/Hunger Games franchise of their very own, The Mortal Instruments: City of Bones is a bona fide saga all right—just not in a good way" adding "Despite the overstuffed assortment of vampires, werewolves, warlocks and demons of all shapes and sizes, The Mortal Instruments seldom feels like anything more than a shameless, soulless knockoff." New York Daily News also gave it a negative rating of 1 star out of 5; critic Jordan Hoffman wrote, "This one is by far the worst of the Twilight copies. And when that bunch includes The Host and I Am Number Four, that's saying something." Hoffman added, "Despite an avalanche of back story, the film is merely an excuse to hop from one spookily dressed set to another. Alas, the titular City of Bones is more of a basement. Other than a gag about a cache of weapons beneath every church altar, there's hardly a moment of levity or imagination. For a film that is wall-to-wall fantasy, you've seen all of this before, in much better movies."

Tom Keogh of The Seattle Times also gave it a negative review, stating, "City of Bones is so overwhelmed by CGI effects that it amounts to white noise for the eyes. Far worse is the way director Harald Zwart can't establish a mature tone to support some of the story's genuinely bold and challenging elements, especially a forbidden-love theme that deserves a more serious context". A more average review came from film critic Stephanie Merry of The Washington Post, who said, "To be fair, there are elements worth celebrating. The film is thankfully less self-serious than the mopey Twilight films. The Mortal Instruments revels in its own camp." She added, "But there is plenty of room for improvement. The action flick is overly long, complicated and, even by teen romance standards, cringe-worthy in its cheesiness."

David Blaustein from ABC News also gave the film an average review of two-and-a-half out of five stars, saying, "Director Harald Zwart unsuccessfully tries to compress teen angst, love, passion, unfulfilled dreams and action into an overzealous, over-the-top, never-ending finale which seems about as well planned as throwing rocks and sand into a blender in the hope that if you blend it long enough at high-enough speed, you might wind up with a delicious milkshake." He then added, "The Mortal Instruments: City of Bones is not a very good film by any stretch of the imagination. However, it does possess a slick, beautiful, young-adult aesthetic and a supernatural, emotional yet nonsensical love triangle that the film's target demographic goes crazy for."

Venetia Falconer of MTV News gave the film a positive review, with a score of 4 out of 5 stars, posting, "The Mortal Instruments more than lives up to its hype of 'The New Twilight'. The special effects are impressive, the battle scenes enthralling and there is solid acting from all members of the cast. The film's main strength is that it perfectly hits the right balance between drama and comedy."

Cinema audiences responded more positively than critics. Viewers who saw the film on the opening Wednesday, gave an average grade of B+, according to market research firm CinemaScore. The audience was 68% female and 46% under the age of 21.

Box office
City of Bones grossed $9.3 million for the three-day weekend in the U.S. and $18.2 million worldwide, debuting in #3 place as the highest ranked new release, although losing out on the top two spots to holdovers from previous weeks (Lee Daniels' The Butler and We're the Millers). For the five-day cumulative total, it grossed $14,088,359 in the U.S. and $23,188,359 worldwide, placing it below estimates of Variety at $18 million, The Hollywood Reporter at $15 million, and Sony itself who predicted $15 million. According to The Wrap, the film "failed to connect" and is on the same course as other misfires Beautiful Creatures and The Host. Forbes also made comparisons with Beautiful Creatures and The Host, and called the five-day weekend gross "a full-blown disaster" as well as "the biggest bomb of the weekend".

Executive producer Martin Moszkowicz blamed the weak opening in the United States on "a strongly competitive environment", including competition from You're Next and The World's End, as well as strong holdovers The Butler and We're the Millers. Moszkowicz was confident, saying it was still too early to call, with the film still rolling out release in more territories worldwide.

As of October 10, 2013, it grossed $31,165,421 at North American box offices and $59,400,000 internationally, bringing the worldwide gross to $90,565,421.

The Hollywood Reporter described the film as a "major in-house flop" and contributing to studio Constantin's losses for the 2013 year.

Accolades
 
The Mortal Instruments won four Canadian Screen Awards: Achievement in Make-Up, Achievement in Overall Sound, Achievement in Sound Editing and Achievement in Visual Effects. It was also nominated for Achievement in Costume Design and Achievement in Art Direction/Production Design. The film was nominated at the 2014 Teen Choice Awards for Choice Movie: Action, Choice Movie: Actor Action, and Choice Movie: Actress Action, but lost to Divergent in all categories.

Sequel

Canceled sequels

On May 8, 2013, before the film was released, it was announced that a film adaptation of the second book City of Ashes, would start production on September 23, 2013 with a 2014 release date. In August 2013, after the film opened below expectations, Kulzer, Constantin's co-president, explained that a sequel was still warranted given increasing book sales and soundtrack revenues. Sigourney Weaver was set to join the cast while Lily Collins, Lena Headey, Jonathan Rhys Meyers, Jemima West, and Jamie Campbell Bower were set to reprise their roles.

On September 10, 2013, The Hollywood Reporter claimed that the sequel "had been pushed in the wake of a lackluster box-office opening" and The Wrap claimed the film had been postponed indefinitely. Moszkowicz responded "... Constantin is committed to making the sequel, the company did not want to rush into production with an unfinished screenplay, preferring to take the time to get right".
Cassandra Clare responded, saying the draft screenplay she saw was "very far from the book" and that the original schedule would not have allowed time for changes, and she thought the delay could therefore be a good thing.

On October 23, 2013, Moszkowicz told The Hollywood Reporter that production on the sequel would resume in 2014, explaining that Constantin was determined to continue the franchise due to the positive response from fans to the adaptation, though noted that the marketing campaign for City of Bones was too narrowly focused on teenage fans, proving to be a detriment of Clare's older readers. Moszkowicz also admitted that nothing had been finalized nor confirmed, saying "It is an ongoing discussion that we are having, and it is not done. We haven't made a final decision. But we will only move forward—and we plan to move forward—when we feel we are going to get it right". Moszkowicz later revealed the intention to shoot the film at some time in 2014. On May 20, 2014, Harald Zwart revealed that the studio still had intentions to make the sequel, but explained that he would not direct it, so that he could focus on other projects, although he complimented the first film as "a good window [for him] to show off".

Scott Mendelson of Forbes magazine expressed surprise that a sequel was in production: "The Mortal Instruments: City of Bones received neither positive reviews nor box office large enough to justify its production and marketing expenses. Yet, against all odds and arguably against all logic, ... it's getting a sequel!"

Television series

On October 12, 2014, at Mipcom, Constantin confirmed that The Mortal Instruments would return as a television series, abandoning previous plans for a film sequel, with Ed Decter as showrunner to start production for next year on at least two or three international shows. Constantin Film and TV head Martin Moszkowicz told The Hollywood Reporter that "It actually makes sense to do (the novels) as a TV series. There was so much from the book that we had to leave out of the Mortal Instruments film. In the series we'll be able to go deeper and explore this world in greater detail and depth."

The television series ran for three seasons, from January 2016 to May 2019.

Games
To tie in with the film, Sony Pictures worked with developers PlayFirst to release a game on August 15, 2013. The game, available free for Android and iOS, allows players to hunt demons and supernatural monsters like the Shadowhunters of the story. That includes cross-platform features, allowing users to sign in on Facebook and save their progress across Android and iOS devices.

References

External links

 
 
 
 
 

2013 films
2013 action films
2013 LGBT-related films
Canadian action films
Canadian LGBT-related films
German action films
English-language Canadian films
English-language German films
Canadian fantasy adventure films
German fantasy adventure films
Films based on fantasy novels
Films about angels
Films based on American novels
Films set in New York City
Films shot in Hamilton, Ontario
Films shot in New York City
Films shot in Toronto
IMAX films
Constantin Film films
Entertainment One films
Screen Gems films
Films directed by Harald Zwart
Films based on young adult literature
Films produced by Don Carmody
Films scored by Atli Örvarsson
The Mortal Instruments
2010s English-language films
2010s Canadian films
2010s German films